Oberoi International School (OIS) is a private, Co-ed (IB) International Baccalaureate school. It was instituted on 17 July 2008 at Oberoi Garden City for Nursery to Grade 12 with internationally recognized education in Mumbai, India. In 2017, the school opened its second campus on Jogeshwari–Vikhroli Link Road (JVLR).

History and foundation
The 2019-2020 academic year marked the completion of Oberoi International School’s 11th year of operation. The school opened its doors in August 2008 to an original, founding cohort of 38 students, and by August 2020, the number of students enrolled at OIS had grown to over 1620 students from Nursery to Grade 12 in OGC Campus and 935 students from Nursery to Grade 11 in JVLR campus.

OGC Campus has achieved full accreditation with the Council of International Schools (CIS) and the New England Association of Schools and Colleges (NEASC). The School is now an active member of the East Asia Regional Council of Schools (EARCOS).

OIS offers all three programmes of International Baccalaureate, Primary Years Programme, Middle Years Programme and Diploma Programme. JVLR Campus opened to students in Nursery-Grade 4 in August 2017.

Management
The current head of school at Oberoi International School for OGC Campus is Mr. Peter Murphy and Dr. Paul Ducharme for the JVLR campus. The school operates under the strategic direction of the Board of Trustees of the Oberoi Foundation.

Education structure

The school is affiliated to International Baccalaureate. It has Primary Years Programme (PYP) from Pre-KG to Grade 5 Middle Year Programme (MYP) from grade 6 to 10  International Baccalaureate Diploma Programme (IBDP) for Grades 11 and 12.

Facilities

Infrastructure: The Oberoi International School’s campuses are planned education establishments developed and built by Oberoi Realty. It has a Wi-Fi-enabled infrastructure comprising well-ventilated ultra-modern classrooms, state-of-the-art laboratories, art rooms and multiple resource centers to support learning. Besides there are fully equipped drama & dance studios, Olympic size pools, a large futsal court, auditorium, multiple music practice rooms, recording studios supported with the latest equipment and resources, a futuristic rock-climbing wall, a basketball court, tennis court, multi-purpose hall, flexible collaborative spaces, etc.

Technology: The classrooms and campus at OIS are completely tech-friendly with interactive projectors and Apple TV, Apple devices to all the students from Grade 4-5 to 12 standard and access to tech-devices for primary students. Besides apps like Zoom, Google Hangouts, Seesaw and ManageBac are also used to teach, review and conduct teacher meetings to discuss progress. Oberoi International School has been recognized as an Apple distinguished school for the use of technology to facilitate learning.

Athletics and extra curricular activities

Extra-curricular activities: Beyond the academic curriculum, the school organizes an annual ECA program that includes ace-speech drama, film making, soft skill workshop, art skills, photography, ballet, rhythmic gymnastics, western and Indian vocal, rope and pole mallakhamb, yoga, amongst others. It also includes many in-class activities like nutty scientist, sculpting and moulding, kathak, QtPi robotics, calligraphy, chess, MAD science NASA, among many.

With emphasis on promoting performing arts, film making and theatre, the school also conducted the Oberoi Film Festival. Other events hosted by the school include the TEDxYouth@OIS,

Athletics: The school has 47 sports teams. As a part of the ECA program, athletics include skating, football, rock climbing, basketball, swimming, gymnastic, cricket, table tennis, rip stick, taekwondo, karate, kickboxing, squash, mini-tennis.

Awards and recognitions
 Oberoi International School has been recognized as an Apple Distinguished School for 2019–2022 for its unique implementation of technology.

 Oberoi International’s JVLR campus has been credited with Gold Status for Leadership in Energy and Environmental Design (LEED) by the United States Green Building Council (USGBC). 

 The school has been consistently awarded amongst the top 3 international schools in the city in the Times of India Survey, Hindustan Times Survey, and Education World Survey.

See also 
 List of schools in Mumbai

References

External links
 Official site
 Details about the school

Private schools in Mumbai
International Baccalaureate schools in India
International schools in Mumbai
Educational institutions established in 2008
2008 establishments in Maharashtra